This is a list of governors of departments of Colombia.

Amazonas Department

Governor of Amazonas Department (List)

Antioquia Department 

Governor of Antioquia Department (List)

Arauca Department 

Governor of Arauca Department (List)

Atlántico Department 

Governor of Atlántico Department (List)

Bolívar Department  

Governor of Bolívar Department (List)

Boyacá Department  

Governor of Boyacá Department (List)

Caldas Department  

Governor of Caldas Department (List)

Caquetá Department  

Governor of Caquetá Department (List)

Casanare Department 

Governor of Casanare Department (List)

Cauca Department  

Governor of Cauca Department (List)

Cesar Department  

Governor of Cesar Department (List)

Chocó Department  

Governor of Chocó Department (List)

Córdoba Department  

Governor of Córdoba (List)

Cundinamarca Department  

Governor of Cundinamarca Department (List)

*Bogotá 

Mayor of Bogotá (List)

La Guajira Department 

Governor of La Guajira Department (List)

Guainía Department   

Governor of Guainía Department (List)

Guaviare Department  

Governor of Guaviare Department (List)

Huila Department   

Governor of Huila Department (List of Governors of Huila Department)

Magdalena Department  

Governor of Magdalena Department (List)

Meta Department  

Governor of Meta Department (List)

Nariño Department  

Governor of Nariño Department (List)

Norte de Santander Department  

Governor of Norte de Santander Department (List)

Putumayo Department  

Governor of Putumayo Department (List)

Quindío Department  

Governor of Quindío Department (List)

Risaralda Department  

Governor of Risaralda Department (List)

San Andrés and Providencia Department  

Governor of San Andrés and Providencia Department (List)

Santander Department  

Governor of Santander Department (List)

Sucre Department  

Governor of Sucre Department (List)

Tolima Department  

Governor of Tolima Department (List)

Valle del Cauca Department  

Governor of Valle del Cauca Department (List)

Vaupés Department  

Governor of Vaupés Department (List)

Vichada Department  

Governor of Vichada Department (List)

See also

List of entities in the executive branch of Colombia